Ichthyosis vulgaris (also known as "autosomal dominant ichthyosis" and "Ichthyosis simplex") is a skin disorder causing dry, scaly skin. It is the most common form of ichthyosis, affecting around 1 in 250 people. For this reason it is known as common ichthyosis. It is usually an autosomal dominant inherited disease (often associated with filaggrin), although a rare non-heritable version called acquired ichthyosis exists.

Presentation

The symptoms of the inherited form of ichthyosis vulgaris are not usually present at birth but generally develop between three months and five years of age. The symptoms will often improve with age, although they may grow more severe again in old age.

The condition is not life-threatening; the impact on the patient, if it is a mild case, is generally restricted to mild itching and the social impact of having skin with an unusual appearance. People with mild cases have symptoms that include scaly patches on the shins, fine white scales on the forearms and upper arms, and rough palms. People with the mildest cases have no symptoms other than faint, tell-tale "mosaic lines" between the Achilles tendons and the calf muscles.

Severe cases, although rare, do exist. Severe cases entail the buildup of scales everywhere, with areas of the body that have a concentration of sweat glands being least affected. Areas where the skin rubs against together, such as the armpits, the groin, and the "folded" areas of the elbow and knees, are less affected. Various topical treatments are available to "exfoliate" the scales. These include lotions that contain alpha-hydroxy acids.

Associated conditions
Many people with severe ichthyosis have problems sweating due to the buildup of scales on the skin. This may lead to problems such as "prickly itch", which results from the afflicted skin being unable to sweat due to the buildup of scales, or problems associated with overheating. The majority of people with vulgaris can sweat at least a little. Paradoxically this means most would be more comfortable living in a hot and humid climate. Sweating helps to shed scales, which improves the appearance of the skin and prevents "prickly itch".

The dry skin will crack on digits or extremities and create bloody cuts. Skin is painful when inflamed and/or tight. For children and adolescents, psychological concerns may include inconsistent self-image, mood fluctuating due to cyclical outbreaks, tendency to addiction, possibility of social withdrawal when skin is noticeably infected, and preoccupation with appearance.

Strong air conditioning and excessive consumption of alcohol can also increase the buildup of scales.

Over 50% of people with ichthyosis vulgaris have some type of atopic disease such as allergies, eczema, or asthma. Another common condition associated with ichthyosis vulgaris is keratosis pilaris (small bumps mainly appearing on the back of the upper arms).

Genetics
Ichthyosis vulgaris is one of the most common genetic disorders caused by a single gene. The disorder is believed to be caused by mutations to the gene encoding profilaggrin (a protein which is converted to filaggrin, which plays a vital role in the structure of the skin). Around 10% of the population have some detrimental mutations to the profilaggrin gene that is also linked to atopic dermatitis (another skin disorder that is often present with ichthyosis vulgaris). The exact mutation is only known for some cases of ichthyosis vulgaris.

It is generally considered to be an autosomal dominant condition, i.e., a single genetic mutation causes the disease and an affected person has a 50% chance of passing the condition on to their child. There is some research indicating it may be semi-dominant. This means that a single mutation would cause a mild case of ichthyosis vulgaris and mutations to both copies of the gene would produce a more severe case.

Diagnosis

See also 
 Harlequin-type ichthyosis
 List of cutaneous conditions
 List of cutaneous conditions caused by mutations in keratins

References

External links 
 
 Photographs from Ichthyosis Information 

Genodermatoses
Rare diseases